Jalamadul  is a village in Chanditala I community development block of Srirampore subdivision in Hooghly district in the Indian state of West Bengal.

Geography

Gram panchayat
Villages and census towns in Bhagabatipur gram panchayat are: Bhadua, Bhagabatipur, Jalamadul, Kanaidanga, Metekhal and Singjor.

Demographics
As per 2011 Census of India, Jalamadul had a total population of 2,293 of which 1,114 (49%) were males and 1,179 (51%) were females. Population below 6 years was 293. The total number of literates in Jalamadul was 1,671 (83.55% of the population over 6 years).

References 

Villages in Chanditala I CD Block